The Owl Club is an all-male final club at Harvard University founded in 1896.

History
The Owl Club was founded in 1896 by Reginald Mansfield Johnson, Malcolm Scollay Greenough, Jr., Frazier Curtis, Preston Player, Charles Clifford Payson, Austen Fox Riggs, and Dudley Hall Bradlee, Jr. Originally established as a secret society, the Club held its meetings in Cambridge's Polo Club Alley before purchasing land on the corner of Holyoke Street and Holyoke Place in 1901.

In 1905, architect James Purdon of Purdon & Little drew up plans for the Georgian clubhouse, and on June 24 of that year the cornerstone of the present clubhouse was laid. The new building was formally opened on March 24, 1906, the tenth anniversary of the Club.

In 1916, it was voted to officially change the name from “Phi Delta Psi Club” to “Owl Club”. The club had become known as The Owl as an abbreviation of its Greek name, Ἀυλὸς χαὶ Ἔκπωμα.

Notable members
Archibald C. Coolidge '87 — Harvard professor and diplomat (Honorary Member).
Robert W. Bliss '00 — American diplomat (Honorary Member).
Edward B. Cole '02 — United States Marine Corps Major, expert on machine guns, casualty at the Battle of Belleau Wood  
Harry Elkins Widener '07 — Benefactor and namesake, Widener Library of Harvard University; casualty on the wreck of the RMS Titanic ocean liner.
George Minot, '08 — Winner of the 1934 Nobel Prize in Medicine.
George Biddle, '08 — American muralist and painter.
Hanford MacNider, '11 — United States Army Lieutenant General and Assistant Secretary of War.
Bobby Jones, '24 — Amateur golfer and winner of the Grand Slam in 1930; Founder of Augusta National Golf Club and the Masters Tournament.
William Gurdon Saltonstall, '28 — American educator, ninth Principal of Phillips Exeter Academy.
Theodore Roosevelt III, '36 — Grandson of President Theodore Roosevelt.
Robert G. Stone, Jr., '45-'47 — Former Chairman of the Harvard Corporation.
J. William Middendorf, III, '47 — U.S. Secretary of the Navy from 1974 to 1977; U.S. Ambassador to the Netherlands and Organization of American States.
Edward "Ted" Kennedy, '54-'56 — U.S. Senator from Massachusetts.
Richard Darman, '64 — Senior Advisor to Presidents Ronald Reagan and George H. W. Bush.
Sean M. Healey, '70 — Founder, Chairman, and Former CEO of AMG.
Charles Hamlin, '70 — Member of 1968 US Olympic rowing team.
Ford M. Fraker, '71 — U.S. Ambassador to the Kingdom of Saudi Arabia; President of the Middle East Policy Council.
Richard Cashin, '75 — Member of 1976 US Olympic rowing team.
Christopher Wood, '75 — Member of 1976 US Olympic rowing team.
Alan Shealy, '75 — Member of 1976 US Olympic rowing team.
Charles Veley, '87 — World's most-traveled man.
Cole Toner, '16, American football offensive guard. Drafted by the Arizona Cardinals in the fifth round of the 2016 NFL Draft
Raymond McGuire, '79, American businessman and political candidate who worked as an executive at Citigroup
Thomas Foley, '75, American politician and business man, U.S. Ambassador to Ireland from 2006 to 2009
Adam Fox, '20, American professional ice hockey defense man for the New York Rangers. 2021 winner of the James Norris Memorial Trophy as the NHL's best defenseman
Rupert Hitzig '60 ,American director, producer, actor, and screenwriter who produced The Last Dragon (1985), Jaws 3 (1983), and The Squeeze (1987) https://en.wikipedia.org/wiki/Rupert_Hitzig
Andrew Cadiff'77, American producer and television director who directed Chasing Liberty
Tommy Lee Jones '69,American actor, Best Supporting Actor for his performance in The Fugitive https://en.wikipedia.org/wiki/Tommy_Lee_Jones

Notes

References
 Owl Club of Harvard College, Membership Directory, 1998, Puritan Press, New Hampshire

Further reading 
 Burggraf, Charles H., The Owl club; a comedy drama in three acts, satirizing secret societies, Albany, OR: Smiley, printer, 1900.
 Owl Club of Harvard College: founded in 1896, Crimson Printing Co., 1966

Harvard University
Collegiate secret societies
Student societies in the United States
Clubs and societies in the United States
Buildings and structures in Cambridge, Massachusetts
1896 establishments in Massachusetts
Student organizations established in 1896